The Bad Bunch is an American 1973 blaxploitation drama film directed by and co-starring Greydon Clark.

Plot
The film is a study of prejudice and discrimination. It tells the story of a black gang who run the streets of Watts and of Jim, a white man, who tries to befriend them. Prejudice stands in the way of any friendship and turns black against white in a mid '70s, does much to show how society has progressed, but to some it may seem that "the more things change, the more they stay the same."

Release
The film was released theatrically in the United States by Four Star International in 1973 and re-released by Dimension Pictures in 1976. The title was changed to Nigger Lover in some markets. Greydon Clark would explore racial themes further in his subsequent films Black Shampoo (1976) and Skinheads (1989).

The Bad Bunch was released on a double feature DVD with Clark's Hi-Riders by VCI Home Entertainment in 2010.

See also
 List of American films of 1973

References

External links
 
 

1973 films
Blaxploitation films
American action drama films
Films directed by Greydon Clark
1970s action drama films
1973 drama films
1970s English-language films
1970s American films